The 1920 Marquette Hilltoppers football team was an American football team that represented Marquette University as an independent during the 1920 college football season. In its fourth season under head coach John J. Ryan, the team compiled a 7–2 record.

Schedule

References

Marquette
Marquette Golden Avalanche football seasons
Marquette Hilltoppers football